Anthony Lamar Brown (born May 15, 1970) is a former professional American football player who played defensive back for two seasons for the Houston Oilers and Seattle Seahawks.

Brown is a graduate of Kennedy High school in Granada Hills, California and former high school teammate of professional football player Mark McMillian.

References

1970 births
Living people
American football cornerbacks
Fresno State Bulldogs football players
Houston Oilers players
Seattle Seahawks players
Tony Brown
Players of American football from Los Angeles